"I Got Nerve" is a song by American recording artist and actress  Miley Cyrus, performing as Hannah Montana – the alter ego of Miley Stewart, a character she plays on the Disney Channel television series Hannah Montana. "I Got Nerve" was written and produced by Jennie Lurie, Ken Hauptman and Aruna Abrams, and was produced by Antonina Armato and Tim James. The song was released to Radio Disney as promotion for the series and its first soundtrack, Hannah Montana.

In the United States, the song peaked at number 67 on the Billboard Hot 100 and within the top 60 on the Pop 100. Its appearance on the Billboard Hot 100 made Cyrus the first act to have six songs debut on the chart in the same week. The song was also certified gold by the Recording Industry Association of America (RIAA) on March 2023. A music video for "I Got Nerve" was taken from footage of a Montana's Radio Disney concert performance.

Background and composition
Written by Jennie Lurie, Ken Hauptman, and Aruna Abrams, and produced by Antonina Armato and Tim James, "I Got Nerve" lasts three minutes and five seconds.

A karaoke version appears on Disney's Karaoke Series: Hannah Montana (2007).

Reception

Critical reception
Heather Phares of Allmusic liked the song and called it a "spunky, new-wavey girl power anthem".

Chart performance
As not released as a single in the United States, "I Got Nerve" received exclusive airplay on Radio Disney, thus its chart appearances consisted mainly of digital downloads. Following the release of the Hannah Montana soundtrack, the song entered Billboard'''s Hot Digital Songs Chart at number thirty-one, which led to an appearance on the Billboard Hot 100 on the week ending November 11, 2006.

"I Got Nerve" debuted on the Billboard Hot 100 at its peak of sixty-seven, thus becoming Cyrus as Montana's highest charting song from the album, and one of the songs to make Cyrus the first act to have six songs debut on the Billboard'' Hot 100 in the same week. It dropped from the chart in the succeeding week. The song also peaked at number fifty-one on the now-defunct Pop 100 Chart.

Music videos and Live performances
Three different live performances have been prominently used for promotional music videos. Cyrus as Montana debuted the song at Walt Disney World Resort's Typhoon Lagoon on June 23, 2006. The video was aired on Disney Channel, along with performances of "The Best of Both Worlds", "This is the Life" and "If We Were a Movie". Another live performance from Radio Disney's 10th Birthday Concert was also used as a music video on Disney Channel. The third live performance was on The Cheetah Girls' The Party's Just Begun Tour and also served as a music video.

The song was also performed during Cyrus' first headline tour, Best of Both Worlds Tour.

Charts

Certification

References

2006 singles
Hannah Montana songs
Walt Disney Records singles